"Supaman High" is a song by American R&B singer R. Kelly featuring OJ da Juiceman, written by R. Kelly, OJ da Juiceman, Gucci Mane and Willy Will for his ninth studio album, Untitled (2009). Produced by R. Kelly and Willy Will.

The record was originally intended be released as the album's lead single. However, as the label and the singer were not in agreement with the song becoming the first single, R. Kelly set up additional sessions to find a new single ("Number One" featuring Keri Hilson). Hence the song served to generate marketing buzz.

Charts

References 

R. Kelly songs
OJ da Juiceman songs
Songs written by R. Kelly
Song recordings produced by R. Kelly
2009 singles
Songs written by Gucci Mane
2008 songs
Jive Records singles